Stephen L. (Lucky)(Dec. 12, 2005). "Composer/conductor Stephen Mosko dead", UPI. Mosko ( - ) was an American composer. His music blended high modernism (including serialism) with world music, and he was an expert in Icelandic folk music. His, "seemingly contradictory," influences include uptown, downtown, and the West Coast school; including John Cage, Milton Babbitt, Elliott Carter, Morton Feldman, and Mel Powell.

Mosko studied with Antonia Brico, Donald Martino, Gustav Meier, Mel Powell, Leonard Stein, and Morton Subotnick.

He was the music director of the San Francisco Contemporary Music Players from 1988 to 1997 and of the Los Angeles Olympic Arts Festival's Contemporary Music Festival in 1984. He was the director of the Ojai Music Festival in 1986 and 1990. He was married to Dorothy Stone, founding flutist of California EAR Unit.

Notable students include composers Ann Millikan and Nicholas Frances Chase.

Discography
Composer
Indigenous Music (1998), The California EAR Unit
Composer Portrait Series: Stephen L. Mosko (2000), Southwest Chamber Music
Music director
For Samuel Beckett by Morton Feldman (1993), San Francisco Contemporary Music Players
Only: Works for Voice and Instruments by Morton Feldman (1996), Joan La Barbara and the San Francisco Contemporary Music Players

Sources

Further reading
 Chute, James. 2001. "Mosko, Stephen". The New Grove Dictionary of Music and Musicians, second edition, edited by Stanley Sadie and John Tyrrell. London: Macmillan Publishers.
Steingrímsson, Hreinn. Stone, Dorothy and Mosko, Stephen L. (eds.) (2000). Kvædaskapur: Icelandic Epic Song.

External links
"The life and work of Stephen L. Mosko”, luxstar.org’’.
"Stephen 'Lucky' Mosko Memorial", MachineProject.com.
"The Music of Stephen 'Lucky' Mosko", RedCat.org.
"Obituary: Stephen 'Lucky' Mosko", NewMusicBox.org.
"Articles about Stephen L. Mosko", LATimes.com.
"Biographical Material about Stephen L. Mosko", LeisurePlanetMusic.com''.
Stephen "Lucky" Mosko scores, recordings, and other material, 1957-2008 at Isham Memorial Library, Harvard University
.

1947 births
2005 deaths
20th-century classical composers
American male classical composers
American classical composers
Music directors
Musicians from Denver
Pupils of Leonard Stein
20th-century American composers
20th-century American male musicians